Al-Barakah is an Arabic surname. Notable people with the surname include:
 Abdulrahman Al-Barakah (born 1990), Saudi Arabian football player
 Khaled Al-Barakah (born 1990), Saudi Arabian football player
 Mousa Al-Barakah (born 1989), Qatari football player

See also
Barakah